David Schlicht (born 3 September 1999) is an Australian swimmer. He competed in the men's 200 metre breaststroke event at the 2018 FINA World Swimming Championships (25 m), in Hangzhou, China.

References

External links
 

1999 births
Living people
Australian male breaststroke swimmers
Place of birth missing (living people)